The Kings of the Road Tour was a tour performed by the heavy metal band Motörhead in support of their album, The Wörld Is Yours.

Background 
During their show at the Wacken Open Air festival the band was forced to cut their setlist short due to frontman Lemmy Kilmister's health, playing only 6 songs in what was supposed to be a 75-minute setlist. Motorhead later posted on their Facebook page: "The show had to go on because that's how Lemmy rolls. Even though he was not 100% fit, he refused to feel he was letting the 85,000 Wacken fans down. They kicked ass in the 100-plus-degree heat for a shortened, but powerful, set before Lemmy finally realized he might have bitten off a little more than he could chew. Thus, he will embark upon the recuperation recommended. We know that rumors are flying around, but once he fully recharges, MOTÖRHEAD will be back, don't you worry!" During their setlist at Download Festival, former Motorhead drummer Phil "Philthy Animal" Taylor came up on stage after the set.

Setlists

Headliner Setlist 
 "I Know How to Die"
 "Damage Case"
 "Stay Clean"
 "Metropolis"
 "Over the Top"
"Doctor Rock"
 Guitar Solo
 "Chase Is Better Than the Catch"
 "Rock It"
 "You Better Run"
 "The One to Sing the Blues" (With drum solo)
 "Going to Brazil"
 "Killed by Death"
 "Ace of Spades"
Encore:
 "Are You Ready" (Thin Lizzy cover)
"Overkill"

Festival Setlist 
 "I Know How to Die"
 "Damage Case"
 "Stay Clean"
 "Metropolis"
 "Over the Top"
 Guitar Solo
 "Chase Is Better Than the Catch"
 "Rock It"
 "The One to Sing the Blues" (With drum solo)
 "Going to Brazil"
 "Killed by Death"
 "Ace of Spades"
Encore:
 "Overkill"

Tour dates

Personnel 
Lemmy Kilmister – bass guitar, lead vocals
Phil Campbell – guitar
Mikkey Dee – drums

References

Motörhead concert tours
2012 concert tours
2013 concert tours